Canopus is a genus of Neotropical bugs with about six species that form the family Canopidae. Bugs in the family Canopidae are small (5–7 mm long) and have a convex lady-bird beetle like shape and are thought to be fungus feeders. The scutellum completely covers the abdomen and wings. The antennae are five segmented.

Eight species are known:
 C. andinus 
 C. burmeisteri 
 C. caesus 
 C. fabricii 
 C. germari 
 C. globosus 
 C. impressus 
 C. orbicularis

References 

Neotropical realm fauna